Apostasimerini is a tribe of flower weevils in the family of beetles known as Curculionidae. There are over 240 genera and nearly 1700 described species in Apostasimerini.

Genera found in North America

 Acentrinops Casey, 1920
 Amercedes Casey, 1894
 Apinocis Lea, 1927
 Barilepis Casey, 1920
 Barilepton LeConte, 1876
 Barinus Casey, 1887
 Buchananius Kissinger, 1957
 Calandrinus LeConte, 1876
 Catapastinus Champion, 1908
 Catapastus Casey, 1892
 Centrinites Casey, 1892
 Centrinogyna Casey, 1892
 Centrinoides Champion, 1908
 Centrinopus Casey, 1892
 Cholinobaris Casey, 1920
 Crotanius Casey, 1922
 Cylindridia Casey, 1920
 Cylindrocerinus Champion, 1908
 Cylindrocerus Schönherr, 1826
 Dealia Casey, 1922
 Diastethus Pascoe, 1889
 Diorymeropsis Champion, 1908
 Dirabius Casey, 1920
 Eisonyx LeConte, 1880
 Eugeraeus Champion, 1908
 Geraeopsis Champion, 1908
 Geraeus Pascoe, 1889
 Haplostethops Casey, 1920
 Idiostethus Casey, 1892
 Lasiobaris Champion, 1909
 Linogeraeus Casey, 1920
 Lipancylus Wollaston, 1873
 Madopterus Schönherr, 1836
 Microcholus LeConte, 1876
 Neocratus Casey, 1920
 Nicentrus Casey, 1892
 Odontocorynus Schönherr, 1844
 Oligolochus Casey, 1892
 Oomorphidius Casey, 1892
 Orthomerinus Champion, 1908
 Pachybaris LeConte, 1876
 Platybaris Champion, 1908
 Platyonyx Schönherr, 1826
 Plocamus LeConte, 1876
 Prionobaris Champion, 1908
 Pseudocentrinus Champion, 1908
 Pseudogeraeus Champion, 1908
 Pseudorhianus Champion, 1908
 Pseudorthomerinus Champion, 1908
 Pseudorthoris Champion, 1908
 Rhianus Pascoe, 1889
 Sibariops Casey, 1920
 Stethobaris LeConte, 1876
 Stethobaroides Champion, 1908
 Trichodirabius Casey, 1920
 Xystus Schönherr, 1826
 Zygobarella Casey, 1920
 Zygobarinus Pierce, 1907
 Zygobaris LeConte, 1876

References

Further reading

External links

 

Baridinae